Károly Zsák (30 August 1895 in Budapest – 2 November 1944 in Budapest) was a Hungarian amateur association football player.

He was a member of the Hungarian Olympic squad at the 1912 Summer Olympics. He was an unused reserve player for the duration of the games and did not play a match in the 1912 football tournament and 1924 football tournament.

For the Hungarian national team he played 30 games as goalkeeper.

References

External links
 Zsák Károly – Biográfia

1895 births
1944 deaths
Hungarian footballers
Association football goalkeepers
Hungary international footballers
Olympic footballers of Hungary
Footballers at the 1912 Summer Olympics
Footballers at the 1924 Summer Olympics
Footballers from Budapest